The blue-speckled forest-skink  (Silvascincus murrayi)  is a species of skink found in Queensland and New South Wales in Australia.

Etymology
The specific name, murrayi, is in honor of Canadian oceanographer, John Murray.

References

Silvascincus
Reptiles described in 1887
Taxa named by George Albert Boulenger
Taxobox binomials not recognized by IUCN